George Bayliss Lothian (20 November 1909 – 13 February 2000) was a Canadian aviator. He was one of the first pilots of Trans-Canada Air Lines in 1937, which later became Air Canada.

Biography 
Lothian was born in Vancouver, British Columbia.

He was the first Canadian pilot to log 100 aircraft crossings of the North Atlantic and set the transatlantic crossing speed record three times.  When he retired from Air Canada in 1968 he had logged over 21,000 as pilot in command of many different piston and jet transport aircraft. He reluctantly gave flight instruction in the Vickers Viscount turboprop airliner to Howard Hughes and did not appreciate either his personal hygiene or his attitude.

Lothian was awarded the Yukon Territory Order of Polaris and was inducted in the Canadian Aviation Hall of Fame in 1973.

References 

1909 births
2000 deaths
Canadian aviators
Canadian Aviation Hall of Fame inductees
People from Vancouver
Canadian aviation record holders